Margaret Trowe (born 1948) is an American politician and women's rights activist. She was the 2000 United States vice presidential candidate for the Socialist Workers Party; she also appeared as their VP candidate in 2004 in those states where official candidate Arrin Hawkins was excluded from the ballot for being constitutionally ineligible to serve as vice president.

Trowe had run for United States Senator for Iowa in 1998 and received 2,400 votes. She also received one write-in vote for President of the United States in the 2004 election. In 2006, she was a candidate for Florida's 18th congressional district. In 2020, Trowe once again ran for a seat on the United States Senate. She was a candidate for Mayor of Louisville, Kentucky, in the 2022 Louisville mayoral election.

References

External links
 

1948 births
Living people
2000 United States vice-presidential candidates
20th-century American politicians
Socialist Workers Party (United States) vice presidential nominees
Women in Florida politics
Women in Iowa politics
Female candidates for Vice President of the United States
20th-century American women politicians
Candidates in the 1998 United States elections
21st-century American women